Rogers Ofime (born March 10, 1973) is a Nigerian born Canadian based film maker and television producer. He is best known for producing several notable Nigerian television soap operas, including the successful Tinsel, which was the first multi-camera studio based television daily soap to be produced by a Nigerian producer in all of East, West or North Africa and more recently Hush.

Early life 

Ofime was born in Lagos, Nigeria. In May 1985, he graduated from St. Paul's Primary School in Lagos, Nigeria and then went on to Iponri Grammar School in Lagos in June 1991 for his secondary school education. After his secondary education, in May 1994 he obtained a Certificate in Drama from the Obafemi Awolowo University in Osun State, southwest Nigeria and another Certificate in Music from the same university in May 1996.

In July 2000 Ofime graduated with a Bachelor of Arts (2nd Class Lower) B.A. Dramatic Arts from the Obafemi Awolowo University, Osun state, Nigeria. In October 2004 he obtained a Masters of Arts (PhD Grade) MA Theatre Arts from the University of Ibadan, Oyo state, Nigeria. In 2016, he graduated from Robertson College in Canada with a certificate in Business Administration. He then enrolled for a PHD at the Lagos State University, Lagos State, Nigeria.

Growing up, Ofime looked up to mentors such as Erika Klopper, Desiree Markgraaf, Tade Ogidan, Richard Mofe Damijo, and would grow to become a fan of Steven Spielberg and Tyler Perry. He had his first opportunity given to him by Tade Ogidan, a foremost Nigerian director. But the opportunity that led to his breakthrough in the television and film industry was given to him by Erika Klopper. According to Ofime, "She believed in me when everyone doubted my ability to deliver a studio based multi-cam daily series."

Career 

In 2001, Ofime began producing movies, television series and commercials as a television production manager in Lagos, Nigeria and by 2005, Ofime took a job with South Africa-based Film Company, Sky Sweeper Films. In his time there, Ofime produced his first set of television commercial projects, which enjoyed notable success.

In 2007, Ofime was head hunted by top South African media company M-net and was commissioned to produce a daily soap opera Tinsel on the M-net/Africa Magic platform. While working on Tinsel, he worked with a 120-member film crew, 15 recurring actors and 500 supporting actors. The show went on to become one of the most viewed television series in Africa, viewed by millions and syndicated across 48 African countries on satellite and local television stations. It also made him the first Nigerian producer to produce a multi-camera, studio-based daily television soap opera in West, North and East Africa.

In 2013, Ofime was mandated by M-net to develop a Tele-film initiative by putting together a team of 120 film-makers to produce at least 80 tele-films in 2013, 60 films in 2014 and 40 in 2015. The movie project initiative, which was successful is called the Africa Magic Original Films (AMOF) project.

Ofime relocated to Winnipeg, Manitoba, Canada and set up his own production company, Theatron Media Incorporated and has worked alongside several notable film producers and directors including Tade Ogidan, Erika Klopper,  Juliette Hagopian, Robert Peters, Curtis Graham, Steve Morrisson and Titus Orpen.

Ofime is the Executive Producer at Native Media TV, a production company, under which platform he produced the series, "Zone 222" and "Till You Are 16" for Africa Magic TV.

In 2020, he produced a movie tittled "Voiceless". A movie that focuses on the troubles faced by those living in the northern part of Nigeria.

Personal life 
Ofime is married to Olabimpe Ofime. They met in the university, and have been married since 2002. They have two children.

Awards and recognition 

At the 2017 Africa Magic Viewers Choice Award (AMVCA), a movie he produced, Oloibiri, was named Best Movie West Africa. The movie is story of the historic town where Nigeria's first commercial oil discovery was made by Shell Darcy in June 1956, and starring Nigerian great actors like Olu Jacobs and Richard Mofe Damijo, Oloibiri beat A Trip to Jamaica, 76, 93 Days and The CEO to win the award.

In May 2015, Ofime was honoured with a plaque by the National Association of the Nigerian Theatre Arts Practitioners, NANTAP, as a certified thespian for his commitment to the development of arts and culture in Nigeria.

A list of Ofime's awards include

 Best Sitcom, AMVCA 2017 - The Johnsons 
 Best actor in Drama, AMVCA 2017 - Hotel Majestic
 Best Actress in drama, AMVCA 2017 - Hush
 Best actor in Comedy, AMVCA 2017 - The Johnsons 
 Best actress (Gold award) International independent film awards Los Angeles - Price of Spice
 Merit award (Best short film), California, USA - One out of Several
 Best Movie West Africa, AMVCA 2017 - Oloibiri
 'Best Foreign Film' Award, 2016 San Diego Black Film Festival, USA - Oloibiri
 'Best Film' in Water Category', 2016 Green Me Global Festival for Sustainability, Lagos - Oloibiri
 Homevida 2016 Award for Feature Film category promoting Transparency, Accountability and Good Governance - Oloibiri 
 'Best Film' Award, 2015 NAFCA, Los Angeles - Oloibiri
 'Best Screenplay' Award, 2015 NAFCA, Los Angeles - Oloibiri 
 The Audio Visual Award (TAVA) for the outstanding producer for 2011 - Tinsel
 Best TV series (English) City People Awards 2017- The Johnsons
 Best Sitcom Nigerian Teen Choice Awards 2016 - The Johnsons
 Best TV sitcom Naija 102.7FM comedy Awards 2017 - The Johnsons
 Best TV sitcom Naija 102.7FM comedy Awards 2018 - The Johnsons
 Best TV series African Youth Choice Awards 2015 - Hotel Majestic
 Best TV series Tava Awards 2010 - Tinsel
 Best Feature Narrative Long Film, American Golden Picture International Film Festival - Make Room
 Best Cinematography, American Golden Picture International Film Festival - Make Room
 Best Editing, American Golden Picture International Film Festival - Make Room
 Best Screenplay, American Golden Picture International Film Festival - Honourable Mention
 Best Picture, Universal Movie Awards 2021 - Voiceless
 Best Director, Universal Movie Awards 2021 - Voiceless
 Best Screenplay, Universal Movie Awards 2021 - Voiceless
 Best Film Edit, Universal Movie Awards 2021 - Voiceless

Filmography

Feature films

Major television series

Short films

Documentaries

Reality Television

References 

1973 births
Living people
Film directors from Winnipeg
Film producers from Manitoba
Canadian television directors
Canadian television producers
Nigerian emigrants to Canada
Obafemi Awolowo University alumni
Residents of Lagos
Nigerian film producers
Nigerian film directors
Lagos State University alumni
University of Ibadan alumni